Central Fraser Valley was a provincial electoral district in the Canadian province of British Columbia from 1979 to 1986. For other Greater Vancouver area ridings please see New Westminster (electoral districts) and/or Vancouver (electoral districts).

Demographics

Political geography

Notable elections

Notable MLAs

Electoral history 
Note:  Winners in each election are in bold.	

 
|Progressive Conservative
|Eva Viola Barton
|align="right"|1,362 		 		
|align="right"|7.57%
|align="right"|
|align="right"|unknown

|- bgcolor="white"
!align="right" colspan=3|Total valid votes
!align="right"|17,982 	
!align="right"|100.00%
!align="right"|
|- bgcolor="white"
!align="right" colspan=3|Total rejected ballots
!align="right"|279
!align="right"|
!align="right"|
|- bgcolor="white"
!align="right" colspan=3|Turnout
!align="right"|%
!align="right"|
!align="right"|
|}

 
|New Democrat
|Harry Wilfred Fontaine
|align="right"|6,628 		 	
|align="right"|25.05%
|align="right"|
|align="right"|unknown
 
|Progressive Conservative
|James Alexander McNeil
|align="right"|3,399 	 	 		 	
|align="right"|12.85%
|align="right"|
|align="right"|unknown

|- bgcolor="white"
!align="right" colspan=3|Total valid votes
!align="right"|26,458 	
!align="right"|100.00%
!align="right"|
|- bgcolor="white"
!align="right" colspan=3|Total rejected ballots
!align="right"|419
!align="right"|
!align="right"|
|- bgcolor="white"
!align="right" colspan=3|Turnout
!align="right"|%
!align="right"|
!align="right"|
|}

 
|Progressive Conservative
|James Alexander McNeil
|align="right"|4,900 		 	 	
|align="right"|9.68%
|align="right"|
|align="right"|unknown

|- bgcolor="white"
!align="right" colspan=3|Total valid votes
!align="right"|50,618 	
!align="right"|100.00%
!align="right"|
|- bgcolor="white"
!align="right" colspan=3|Total rejected ballots
!align="right"|627
!align="right"|
!align="right"|
|- bgcolor="white"
!align="right" colspan=3|Turnout
!align="right"|%
!align="right"|
!align="right"|
|- bgcolor="white"
!align="right" colspan=7|1  <small>Seat increased to two members from one.
|}

Sources 

Elections BC Historical Returns

Former provincial electoral districts of British Columbia